Zhonghe Town is a town in Liuyang, Hunan, China.  it had a population of 23,700 and an area of .  It borders Yonghe Town in the north, Wenjiashi in the east and southeast, and Gaoping Town and Chengtanjiang Town in the west.

History
In 206, in the 14th year of Jian'an period (196–220) of the Eastern Han dynasty (25–220), the town belongs to the jurisdiction of Lixiang County.

During the Deyou period (1275–1276) of the Southern Song dynasty (1127–1279), the Mongolian army invaded the town and the local residents were slaughtered.

In 1675, in the 14th year of Kangxi period of Qing dynasty (1644–1911), the Eight Banners fought against Wu Sangui here and the local residents fled from their hometown in order to avoid the war.

In June 1956, Qingxi Township and Zhonghe Township merged into "Zhonghe Township". In 1995, Shanzao Township merged into Zhonghe Township. In 2000, Zhonghe was upgraded to a Town.

Administrative division
The town is divided into seven villages and two communities, the following areas: Cangfang Community, Yashan Community, Dingziqiao Village, Qingjiang Village, Zhonghe Village, Chang'an Village, Shanzaotan Village, Xiaojiang Village, and Jianghe Village.

Geography
Longwangpai is the highest place in the town, measures  in height.

Qingjiang Reservoir is located in the town.

Education
Public junior high school in the town includes the Zhonghe Meddle School.

Transportation
 County road: Wenjiashi–Zhonghe County Road, Wenjiashi-Shanzao County Road, etc.

Attractions

Former Residence of Hu Yaobang is the scenic spot in the town.

Jiufeng Temple is a Buddhist temple in the town.

Qingfeng Pavilion and Wenfeng Tower are tourist attractions in the town.

References

Divisions of Liuyang
Liuyang